Christian Schulte (born 7 August 1975) is a German field hockey goalkeeper who competed in the 2004 Summer Olympics and in the 2008 Summer Olympics.

References

External links
 

1975 births
Living people
German male field hockey players
Male field hockey goalkeepers
Olympic field hockey players of Germany
2002 Men's Hockey World Cup players
Field hockey players at the 2004 Summer Olympics
2006 Men's Hockey World Cup players
Olympic bronze medalists for Germany
Olympic medalists in field hockey
Medalists at the 2004 Summer Olympics
Sportspeople from Neuss
21st-century German people